Thrillkill is a Canadian crime thriller film, directed by Anthony D'Andrea and released in 1984. The film stars Gina Massey as Bobbie Kendall, a woman on the run from an electronic bank robbery ring after her video game designer sister Carly (Diana Reis) hid the money inside her new game Thrillkill before being murdered, leaving Bobbie as the only person who knows where the password is hidden.

The film's cast also includes Robin Ward as police officer Frank Gillette, Laura Robinson as Carly's accomplice Adrian, Frank Moore as the CEO of Brightstar Games, and Eugene Clark and Colleen Embree as video arcade owners involved in the robbery scheme.

John Clement received a Genie Award nomination for Best Cinematography at the 6th Genie Awards in 1985.

References

External links

1984 films
1984 drama films
Canadian crime thriller films
English-language Canadian films
Films about video games
1980s English-language films
1980s Canadian films